Qtractor is a hard disk recorder and digital audio workstation application for Linux. Qtractor is written in C++ and is based on the Qt framework. Its author is Rui Nuno Capela, who is also responsible for the Qjackctl, Qsynth and Qsampler line of Linux audio software. Qtractor's intention was to provide digital audio workstation software simple enough for the average home user, and yet powerful enough for the professional user.

Released under the terms of the GNU General Public License, Qtractor is a free and open-source software application.

Overview
Qtractor is a non-destructive digital audio and MIDI multi-track composition sequencer and arranger software application. It does not affect, alter or modify the audio and/or MIDI files that are displayed as Clip Objects. Exceptions are files resulting from capture and recording operations or from explicit changes made through specialized Clip editing (e.g., MIDI Editor).

Qtractor was simply the hobby project of one developer. Development was started in April 2005, initially as a Qt3 application. Since October 2006, it is officially a Qt4 application. Meanwhile, it can be built against Qt5.

Qtractor is natively hardwired and exclusive to the JACK Audio Connection Kit infrastructure, and the ALSA sequencer for MIDI.  It is a Linux-only application.

Features 
Supports all sample rates, only restricted by hardware.
Supports multiple audio file formats, both compressed and uncompressed, including older formats such as 8SVX and .iff.
Clip editing and automatic or manual time stretching abilities.
Supports most major audio and MIDI file formats and most Linux plugin technologies.
Clips may be easily edited by dragging the left or right edges for cropping, or even for timeshifting, by using the shift key modifier.
Qtractor may be used in an audio mastering environment. Its integration with JACK makes it possible to use mastering tools such as JAMin to process the audio data.
Qtractor has both an audio and MIDI metronome with user selectable audio samples.
Easily move and copy plugins (with params) among tracks.
Keyboard commands (hotkeys) are entirely customizable.
Audition audio files within the Files dialog.
Built-in Qjackctl Connections dialog.
Supports LADSPA, DSSI (this includes DSSI-VST wrapper), native Linux VST (version 2 and 3), CLAP and LV2 plugins.

Compatibility 

Qtractor relies on plugins to enable many features from audio effects processing to dynamic control. Qtractor supports the LADSPA plugin architecture, as well as DSSI, native Linux VST (versions 2 and 3), CLAP and LV2. Support for Steinberg's VST plugin standard with Wine is available using the DSSI-VST wrapper. Qtractor stores these connections, and re-establishes them when a project is reloaded.

See also 

 Ardour (audio processor)
 List of free audio software
 List of Linux audio software
 List of music software

References

 Qtractor home page

External links
 Project home page

Free audio editors
Free music software
Free software programmed in C++
Audio editing software that uses Qt
Audio software with JACK support
Digital audio workstation software
Software derived from or incorporating Wine
Digital audio editors for Linux
Linux-only free software